Daimler Straight-Eight engines were eight-cylinder in-line petrol engines made by the Daimler Company to power the largest and most expensive cars in their range. The Straight-Eight engines replaced Daimler's earlier Double-Six V12 engines. Unlike the Double-Six engines, which used sleeve valves based on the Knight patents, the Straight-Eights used conventional poppet valves in the overhead valve configuration.

Three series of Straight-Eight engines were built between 1934 and the outbreak of the Second World War in 1939; another series, the DE36, was built after the war from 1946 to 1953.

Origin
The Straight-Eight engine was announced by The Daimler Company Limited on 1 May 1934 with its first vehicle, Daimler's new Twenty-Five saloon and limousine. The new engine was the first of a series intended to replace Daimler's outmoded large sleeve-valve six-cylinder and twelve-cylinder engines. The sleeve-valve engines with silence and great low-speed torque were unable to spin fast enough to make full use of new combustion technology and remain reliable. These new engines were intended to run comfortably at 4,000 rpm.

The general aim with the engine was "to give the greatest luxury in travel as expressed by quietness, smoothness, flexibility, and general ease and safety of control rather than great speed".

While a great deal of useful experience had been acquired by Daimler from Lanchester, who were still building their overhead camshaft straight-eight when they were purchased in 1931, the Daimler Straight-Eight is not a copy.

Twenty-Five V 26

The crankshaft was fully counterbalanced, mounted in nine main bearings, and fitted with a vibration damper. They were overhead and driven by pushrods from a chain driven camshaft taking power from the rear end of the crankshaft.

Increased engine size
In September 1935 it was announced that the cylinder bore was now increased to 80 mm increasing the engine's capacity from 3.746 to 4.624 litres following the 25% reduction in horsepower tax which took effect on 1 January 1935. intended to provide improved performance but more important lighter running for the engines and a consequent extension of silent and comfortable service. The tax horsepower rating is now 31.74.

Thirty-Two V 4½

In most respects, the Thirty-Two V 4½ was a bored out version of the V26, which it replaced. The compression ratio was increased to 6 to 1. These engines were also fitted to a number of chassis made after 1936 which were fitted with a Lanchester radiator and nameplates.

Light Straight-Eight E 3½ and E 4

Introduced in 1936, the E 3½ was an entirely new engine to power a livelier car for the owner driver. During 1935 a 3½-litre Straight-Eight open car achieved a maximum timed speed at Brooklands of slightly in excess of 90 mph.

Increased engine size
The increase in bore increased the following:
Cubic capacity to 
Power output to  @3,600 rpm, and
Tax rating to 29.77 hp

Thirty-Six DE 36

The DE 36 was the last Daimler Straight-Eight.

Notes

References

External links

 DE36, the biggest car in the world, 1947
 Body of V 26
 DE 36 swansong

Straight-Eight
Vehicles introduced in 1934
Gasoline engines by model